Lambula pallida is a moth of the family Erebidae. It was described by George Hampson in 1900. It is found on Borneo and in Thailand. The habitat consists of dry heath forests and coastal forests.

References

 

Lithosiina
Moths described in 1900